Chewey is a census-designated place (CDP) in Adair County, Oklahoma, United States. The population was 135 at the 2010 census.

Geography

Demographics

As of the census of 2000, there were 135 people, 44 households, and 38 families residing in the CDP. The population density was 6.2 people per square mile (2.4/km2). There were 48 housing units at an average density of 2.2/sq mi (0.9/km2). The racial makeup of the CDP was 33.33% White, 62.96% Native American, and 3.70% from two or more races. Hispanic or Latino of any race were 0.74% of the population.

There were 44 households, out of which 38.6% had children under the age of 18 living with them, 70.5% were married couples living together, 11.4% had a female householder with no husband present, and 11.4% were non-families. 11.4% of all households were made up of individuals, and 2.3% had someone living alone who was 65 years of age or older. The average household size was 3.07 and the average family size was 3.26.

In the CDP, the population was spread out, with 27.4% under the age of 18, 7.4% from 18 to 24, 30.4% from 25 to 44, 20.0% from 45 to 64, and 14.8% who were 65 years of age or older. The median age was 33 years. For every 100 females, there were 104.5 males. For every 100 females age 18 and over, there were 100.0 males.

The median income for a household in the CDP was $22,500, and the median income for a family was $22,167. Males had a median income of $31,250 versus $16,875 for females. The per capita income for the CDP was $11,201. There were 12.0% of families and 15.2% of the population living below the poverty line, including 19.0% of under eighteens and 7.7% of those over 64.

Notable person
 Leon Pense - Professional football player with the University of Arkansas and Pittsburgh Steelers (1945).

References

Census-designated places in Adair County, Oklahoma
Census-designated places in Oklahoma
Cherokee towns in Oklahoma